Cream City Review is a volunteer-based, non-profit literary magazine devoted to publishing memorable and energetic pieces that push the boundaries of "literature." Continually seeking to explore the relationship between form and content, the magazine features fiction, poetry, creative nonfiction, comics, reviews of contemporary literature and criticism, as well as author interviews and artwork.

Published biannually, Cream City Review attracts readers and submissions from around the globe. Approximately 4,000 submissions are received each year from both unpublished and established writers. The journal reflects this mix as it often publishes poets laureate beside artists who are up and coming.

History
The magazine was founded in 1975 by Mary Zane Allen. After working at The Wisconsin Review, she desired a similar literary journal for the creative writing department at the University of Wisconsin–Milwaukee. Allen worked with the student union to establish both the magazine and a reading series. Later, the magazine began operating with the support of UWM's English Department.

Over the years, Cream City Review has evolved from an 8″ X 11″, 50 page, Xeroxed zine to the 175-225 page perfect-bound book format that it is today. The shift to glossy, multicolored covers began in the fall of 1989 after Laurie Buman became art editor. These covers have become one of the magazine's trademarks.

Along with Cream City Review’s physical publications, the magazine also has a significant digital presence. Starting in March of 2019, Cream City Review began a blog, which features a variety of content, such as numerous authorial readings, reviews, interviews, and event results. Cream City Review is also present on social media. Specifically, it is on Instagram and Facebook, where the magazine posts poems, art, information about events and submissions, as well as other interactive content. Current and past issues can be found at Project Muse: https://muse.jhu.edu/issue/47892

Cream City Review's name pays tribute to the publication's home in Milwaukee. Known as "The Cream City," Milwaukee is the birthplace of the yellow-colored brick, made exclusively from clay native to the area. The first "cream" brick was made in 1835. The bricks proved more durable and aesthetically pleasing than the traditional red bricks produced by East Coast kilns and quickly became Milwaukee's most characteristic building material. Cream City bricks remained popular throughout the 19th century and were used widely for ornamental architecture throughout the United States and Europe.

Cream City Review's continued success is due, in large part, to grants from the Bradley Foundation, the Wisconsin Arts Board, as well as support from the University of Wisconsin–Milwaukee (specifically, the English Department), and the Letters and Science Constituent Alumni Association. Additionally, Cream City Review is immensely grateful for its succession of dedicated volunteers and a loyal following of readers and subscribers.

Current Masthead (2022- Present) 
 Editor-in-chief: Camilla Jiyun Nam Lee
 Managing editor: Kathryne David Gargano 
 Associate editor: Angela Voras-Hills
 Fiction editor: Jehane Sharah, John Thurgood
 Poetry editors: Seth Copeland, Korey Hurni
 Creative nonfiction editor: Ty Newcomb, Danielle Harms
 Production manager: Kristopher Purzycki
 Web editors: 
 Interns:

 Advisory board: Liam Callanan (chair)

Past Masthead (2021-2022)
 Editor-in-chief: Canese Jarboe
 Managing editor: Camilla Jiyun Nam Lee
 Associate editor: Kathryne David Gargano 
 Fiction editor: John Thurgood
 Poetry editors: Sasheene Denny, Kathryne David Gargano
 Creative nonfiction editor: Danielle Harms
 Production manager: Kristopher Purzycki
 Web editors: Jeremy Carnes, Geoff Gimse
 Interns: Sakina Schaub, Grayson Trzcinko
 Development manager: Caitlin Scarrano
 Copy editor: kizzy fay
 Advisory board: Liam Callanan (chair), Kimberly Blaeser, Brenda Cárdenas, Dave Clark, George Makana Clark, Rebecca Dunham, Lane Hall

Distinguished past contributors 

 Kate Braverman
 Charles Bukowski
 Robert Olen Butler
 Maxine Chernoff
 Amy Clampitt
 Billy Collins
 Oliver de la Paz
 Tess Gallagher
 Diane Glancy
 Joy Harjo
 Bob Hicok
 Allison Joseph,
 Caroline Knox
 Ted Kooser
 Audre Lorde
 J.D. McClatchy
 Simon Ortiz
 Linda Pastan
 Ricardo Pau-Llosa
 Adrienne Rich
 Alberto Ríos
 Catie Rosemurgy
 Denise Sweet
 James Tate
 Mark Turcotte
 Gordon Weaver
 Aimee Bender
 Ben Percy

See also
List of literary magazines

References

External links
 Official website 
Poets and Writers 
"Celebrating the Cream City and Literature 'Milwaukee's 'Cream City Review' ", Door County Pulse
Project Muse

1975 establishments in Wisconsin
Literary magazines published in the United States
Biannual magazines published in the United States
Magazines established in 1975
Magazines published in Wisconsin
Mass media in Milwaukee